A number of ships have carried the name Glücksburg, including:

Ship names